Hyo Kang has had a distinguished and versatile career as violinist, teacher and artistic director for the past five decades. Currently, he is on the faculty of the Juilliard School (since 1978), and Yale School of Music (since 2006). In the past, Mr. Kang was on the faculties of the Aspen Music School in Colorado from 1978–2005 and the Japan-Aspen Music Festival in Nagano, Japan from 1994-97. His students have distinguished themselves with top prizes at the world’s most prestigious competitions and are performing with major orchestras worldwide. Mr. Kang’s former students include David Chan, Gil Shaham, Sarah Chang, and Kim Chee-Yun, among many others.

In a career spanning forty years from 1964 to 2003, he has made numerous concert tours in the United States, Europe, Asia, Canada, and Central America. As a member of the highly acclaimed Theatre Chamber Players of the Kennedy Center in Washington, D.C. for more than twenty years, he has given many works their American premieres, and has enjoyed musical collaborations with artists such as Leon Fleisher, Pina Carmirelli, and Walter Trampler.

In 1994, Mr. Kang founded Sejong Soloists – a first-class string orchestra hailed by CNN as a top ensemble of today – and has served as artistic director, directing Sejong’s 500 performances in 120 cities around the world. He also was the Founding Artistic Director of the Great Mountains International Music Festival in PyeongChang, South Korea, the site of the 2018 PyeongChang Winter Olympics. He led the festival from 2004 through 2010 to its establishment as the foremost music festival in Korea.

In 2003, the Council of the City of New York honored him for his exceptional contributions to education and cultural life in America, and the government of Korea awarded him the National Arts Medal for his contribution to the arts. In 2017, he received the 31st Inchon Award presented by Dong-A newspaper, one of the most prestigious awards given in Korea. He has been the subject of several television documentaries, with the most recent one in 2013 titled ‘Violinist Hyo Kang: Teacher of Genius Musicians’ by Korean Broadcasting System.

Hyo Kang was born in Seoul, Korea and graduated from the Juilliard School where he studied with Dorothy DeLay. He also studied with Berl Senofsky at the Peabody Institute.

References

Yale School of Music faculty
Juilliard School faculty